Lindita Nikolla (born: 22 October 1965) is an Albanian politician
who is serving as the Speaker of the Parliament since September 10, 2021.
Previously she served as the Ministry of Education, Sports and Youth in September 2013 until May 2017, where she temporarily handed over the post to Mirela Karabina as part of a pre-election agreement between the position and the opposition. Mrs Nikolla was appointed again Minister of Education, Sports and Youth in September 2017 until 2019.

References

1965 births
21st-century Albanian women politicians
21st-century Albanian politicians
Education ministers of Albania
Government ministers of Albania
Living people
Members of the Parliament of Albania
People from Tirana
Socialist Party of Albania politicians
Speakers of the Parliament of Albania
Women government ministers of Albania
Women members of the Parliament of Albania
Youth ministers of Albania
Women legislative speakers